Ancylosis ochracea is a species of snout moth in the genus Ancylosis. It was described by Staudinger, in 1870. It is found in Spain.

References

Moths described in 1870
ochracea
Moths of Europe